City Mall is a shopping mall located in Amman, Jordan, owned by the Al-Khayr Real Estate Investment Company. It opened in 2006. It is known as one of the most famous hangout spots in Jordan.

Anchors include Carrefour, Zara, BeBe, Debenhams, Aizone, GAP, Virgin Megastores, Mango, TGI Fridays, Grand Cinemas, H&M, and Jingo Jungle.

See also

Mecca Mall
Abdali Mall

References

Tourism in Jordan
Shopping malls in Jordan
Shopping malls established in 2006